The National Institutions Building is located in downtown Jerusalem, on King George Street. The structure was built for the national Zionist institutions—the Jewish Agency and the World Zionist Organization, amongst others—and became a symbol of the Jewish state prior to Israel's establishment. It was targeted by a car bomb on March 11, 1948, in one of the worst attacks of the 1948 War of Independence up to that time. The establishment of the State of Israel was declared on the building's balcony by members of the People's Assembly who were besieged in Jerusalem and thus unable to reach the declaration in Tel Aviv. The building also hosted the first sessions of the Knesset, and Israel's first president, Chaim Weizmann was inaugurated in its great hall.

The building's construction 
The plot of land on which the building is located was planned by the architect Richard Kauffmann, who designed the Rehavia neighborhood, to be the site of the Hebrew Gymnasium Rehavia. Local residents preferred that the school be located within the neighborhood rather than at its edge, and so the school was built on the plot meant for the neighborhood synagogue, while the lot on King George Street was allocated to the National Institutions.

In 1927, an architectural competition was held and 37 proposals submitted. Among the presenters were architects Richard Kauffmann, Alexander Baerwald, Arieh Sharon, and Eliezer Yellin.

The leadership of the National Institutions required that the building be no more than two stories in height, that it be a single structure divided into three sections (for the  Zionist Executive—composed of the World Zionist Organization and the Jewish Agency for Israel—as well as the Jewish National Fund and  Keren Hayesod), and the building be well-suited to the city's character. The construction budget was £30,000 (approximately $2 million today).

The design selected was that of the architect Yohanan Ratner, who wrapped the structure around a large forecourt in order to create a formal presence while isolating it from the noise from the street, as well as to maintain the impressive facade of the building despite its lowness in comparison to surrounding structures.

Ratner designed the building in the International Style, but included elements unique to Jerusalem. The building contains outer elements similar to those of the Tower of David and the windows are reminiscent of the slits in the Old City Walls

The design was selected despite some criticism, particularly with regard to its comparatively low height. Architect Benjamin Cheikin argued that the building was too low compared to the buildings of other religious groups in Jerusalem, including the nearby Terra Sancta building.

Construction work began in 1928. Due to budgetary problems, the construction was completed in stages. The first floor of the building was dedicated in 1930, and the second story was completed in 1936.

Memorial to Victims of Antisemitism around the World 
In 2008, the National Institutions House established The Memorial to Victims of Antisemitism around the World in design of a Star of David shape, on which are inscribed the names of the Jews who were killed around the world in anti-Semitic acts. Every year in front of the memorial, there is a ceremony in memory of all Jews who were killed in anti-Semitic events around the world.

References

External links 

 The National Institutions House (Hebrew) in the Haganah website.

Organizations based in Jerusalem
Zionist organizations
Buildings and structures completed in 1936
Buildings and structures in Jerusalem